Charles Arnould Tournemire (22 January 1870 – 3 or 4 November 1939) was a French composer and organist, notable partly for his improvisations, which were often rooted in the music of Gregorian chant. His compositions include eight symphonies (one of them choral), four operas, twelve chamber works and eighteen piano solos. He is mainly remembered for his organ music, the best known being a set of pieces called L'Orgue mystique.

Biography
Born in Bordeaux, Tournemire moved in adolescence to Paris, and there became one of César Franck's three youngest students (the other two were Henri Büsser and a Belgian, Guillaume Lekeu, the latter having been born only two days before Tournemire).

From 1898 (on the resignation of Gabriel Pierné) to 1939, Tournemire served as the organiste titulaire at Franck's old church, the Basilique Ste-Clotilde, Paris. He was also professor of chamber music at the Paris Conservatoire. In 1931, he published a biography of Franck.

A year before the biography appeared, Tournemire recorded five organ improvisations, which were later transcribed by Maurice Duruflé from phonograph recordings. Of ten 78-rpm discs which Tournemire made in 1930, playing the Aristide Cavaillé-Coll organ of Sainte-Clotilde, five contain compositions by Franck. This set of discs was awarded the Grand Prix du Disque in 1931 and has been reissued on both LP and CD.

Insofar as Tournemire's name is now remembered, it is usually spoken of in connection with his largest composition, L'Orgue mystique, a group of 51 sets of five pieces each (except for Holy Saturday, which contains only three pieces), all written between 1927 and 1932. This collection covers the cycle of the Roman Catholic liturgical year, each set being based on the Gregorian chants for the day. Unlike the symphonies of Charles-Marie Widor, which are usually heard in secular recitals (even when individual movements of these symphonies had liturgical origins), L'Orgue mystique was designed for church use.

Tournemire died in Arcachon, France, in 1939. The precise cause of his death is uncertain. All that is known is he left his house on October 31 for a walk and never returned. His body was found in a bog in Arcachon, a fair distance from where he left, on November 4 and he was presumed to have died on November 3 or 4.

Further reading
 Lord, Robert Sutherland.  “Liturgy and Gregorian Chant in L’Orgue Mystique of Charles Tournemire.”  The Organ Yearbook 15 (1984): 60–97. 
 Lord, Robert Sutherland. "Charles Tournemire and the Seven Words of Christ on the Cross." The Diapason, November 1977 
 Jennifer Donelson and Fr. Stephen Schloesser (eds): Mystic Modern: The Life, Thought, and Legacy of Charles Tournemire (Richmond, Virginia: Church Music Association of America, 2014), .
 Joël-Marie Fauquet: Catalogue de l'œuvre de Charles Tournemire (Geneva: Minkoff, 1979).
 Pascal Ianco: Charles Tournemire, ou Le Mythe de Tristan (Geneva: Papillon, 2001), .
 Rollin Smith: Toward an Authentic Interpretation of the Organ Works of César Franck, chapter 8: "The Tournemire Recordings", Juilliard Performance Guide I (New York: Pendragon Press, 1983), .

References

External links

 Complete list of works
 
 Article and review, on Tournemire's chamber works
 Charles Tournemire Memories Contains worklist, though that is the only working link on the page, which has not been updated in eight years (Feb. 2008).

1870 births
1939 deaths
19th-century classical composers
19th-century French composers
19th-century French male musicians
20th-century classical composers
20th-century French composers
20th-century French male musicians
Academic staff of the Conservatoire de Paris
Cathedral organists
Composers for pipe organ
French classical composers
French classical organists
French male classical composers
French opera composers
Male opera composers
French male organists
Organ improvisers
Musicians from Bordeaux
Male classical organists